Atahualpa O. Severino (born November 6, 1984) is a Dominican former professional baseball pitcher. He has played in Major League Baseball (MLB) with the Washington Nationals.

Professional career

Washington Nationals
Severino began his professional career in 2006, pitching for the DSL Nationals. He appeared in 13 games, eight of which were starts, going 2-0 with a 0.99 ERA in 45 innings, striking out 69 batters.

In 2007, he pitched for the DSL Nationals (3-0, 0.48 ERA in 3 games started) and GCL Nationals (1-0, 2.94 ERA in 13 games, five starts), going a combined 4-0 with a 2.06 ERA in 16 games (eight starts). He had 59 strikeouts in 52 innings.

He split the 2008 season between the Potomac Nationals (0-4, 3.96 ERA in 26 relief appearances) and Hagerstown Suns (4-2, 4.05 ERA in 15 relief appearances), going a combined 4-6 with a 4.00 ERA in 41 relief appearances.

He improved in 2009, as he split the season between Potomac (4-0, 2.54 ERA in 29 games) and Harrisburg Senators (6-0, 2.78 ERA in 15 games), going a combined 10-0 with a 2.62 ERA in 44 relief appearances.

He appeared on the Major League roster with the Nationals for three days in 2010, but did not make a pitching appearance at that level.

Severino made his Major League debut on September 6, 2011. He appeared as a reliever in 6 games in 2011, going 1-0 with a 3.86 ERA in 4 innings, striking out 7 and walking 1.

In 2012 Severino made 46 relief appearances for the Triple-A Syracuse Chiefs, posting a record of 3-0 with a 2.81 ERA plus three saves. He was designated for assignment on August 6, 2012.

Kansas City Royals
On November 16, 2012 the Kansas City Royals announced they had signed Severino to a minor-league contract for the 2013 season. No financial terms of the deal were announced.

Pittsburgh Pirates
Severino was traded to the Pittsburgh Pirates on May 30, 2013, in exchange for cash considerations.

Atlanta Braves
He signed a minor league deal with the Atlanta Braves in December 2013.

Sultanes de Monterrey
On April 1, 2016, Severino signed with the Sultanes de Monterrey of the Mexican Baseball League. He became a free agent after the 2016 season.

Diablos Rojos del México
On December 7, 2017, Severino signed with the Diablos Rojos del México of the Mexican Baseball League. He was released on April 8, 2018.

Return to Monterrey
On April 13, 2018, Severino signed with the Sultanes de Monterrey of the Mexican Baseball League.

Tigres de Quintana Roo
On June 17, 2018, Severino was traded to the Tigres de Quintana Roo of the Mexican Baseball League. He was released on July 27, 2018.

International career
He was selected Dominican Republic national baseball team at 2013 World Baseball Classic and 2019 Pan American Games Qualifier.

References

External links

1984 births
Living people
Águilas de Mexicali players
Diablos Rojos del México players
Dominican Summer League Nationals players
Dominican Republic expatriate baseball players in Mexico
Dominican Republic expatriate baseball players in the United States
Gigantes del Cibao players
Gulf Coast Nationals players
Gwinnett Braves players
Hagerstown Suns players
Harrisburg Senators players
Indianapolis Indians players
Major League Baseball pitchers
Major League Baseball players from the Dominican Republic
Mexican League baseball pitchers
Omaha Storm Chasers players
People from Cotuí
Potomac Nationals players
Salt Lake Bees players
Sultanes de Monterrey players
Syracuse Chiefs players
Tigres de Quintana Roo players
Tigres del Licey players
Washington Nationals players
World Baseball Classic players of the Dominican Republic
2013 World Baseball Classic players
Dominican Republic expatriate baseball players in Nicaragua